As of January 18, 2023, there are 22 women currently serving (excluding acting capacity) as lieutenant governors in the United States. Overall, 118 women have served (including acting capacity).

Women have been elected lieutenant governor from 40 of the 50 states. The states that have the position of lieutenant governor and have not yet elected a woman are Georgia, Tennessee, Texas, Washington and West Virginia. The states that do not have the position of lieutenant governor are Arizona, Maine, New Hampshire, Oregon and Wyoming. The holders of the first in line to the governorship there, either the secretary of state or senate president, are listed here separately.

14 female lieutenant governors have become governors of their respective states and 6 female secretaries of state have become governors of their respective states.

Rosemarie Myrdal is the oldest living former female Lieutenant Governor at the age of 93. 


History 
The first woman to become lieutenant governor was Matilda Dodge Wilson (R), who was appointed lieutenant governor of Michigan in 1940 by Luren Dickinson.

In 1978, Jean King (D) was elected as the first female Asian-American lieutenant governor, when she was elected lieutenant governor of Hawaii.

In 2002, Jennette Bradley (R) was elected as the first female African-American lieutenant governor, when she was elected lieutenant governor of Ohio.

In 2010, Jennifer Carroll (R) was elected as the first female military veteran lieutenant governor, when she was elected lieutenant governor of Florida.

In 2014, Evelyn Sanguinetti (R) was elected as the first female Hispanic or Latino lieutenant governor, when she was elected lieutenant governor of Illinois.

Kentucky was the first state to hold a transfer of power from one female lieutenant governor to another, when Martha Layne Collins was elected to succeed Thelma Stovall in 1979.

Minnesota has had the most female lieutenant governors or other deputy leaders of any state in the Union, with nine consecutive female lieutenant governors since 1983. However, no female politician has been nominated for governor by any major statewide party in any of Minnesota's gubernatorial elections.

No state ever had both a female governor and permanent female lieutenant governor at the same time until Arkansas and Massachusetts achieved this feat as a result of the 2022 gubernatorial elections. In New York, Andrea Stewart-Cousins became acting Lieutenant Governor on Kathy Hochul's succeeding Gov. Andrew M. Cuomo of New York during his third term on August 24, 2021. 

From 1997 to 2009, Arizona had two female governors and two concurrently serving female secretaries of state.

To date, in states without a lieutenant governor, no woman has ever changed parties during her term as a secretary of state or a state senate president, or been elected as an independent.

List of female lieutenant governors 

Italics denotes acting lieutenant governor

List of female secretaries of state 
Certain states do not have a lieutenant governor; instead they have a Secretary of State next in line for succession of governor.

Italics denotes acting Secretary of State

List of female Senate presidents 
Two states — Maine and New Hampshire — do not have a Lieutenant Governor, and do not have the Secretary of State as first in the line of succession to the Governor. In these two states, the President of the State Senate is first in line to succeed the Governor.

Italics denotes acting Senate President

List of female federal district council chairs 
In the District of Columbia, the chairman of the Council of the District of Columbia is first in line of succession in the event of a vacancy in the office of mayor of the District of Columbia.

See also 
List of female governors in the United States

Notes

References 

Lieutenant governors